Michèle Jäggi (born 22 September 1987) is a Swiss curler. Jäggi has represented Switzerland as a junior curler, and is currently active on the World Curling Tour. Jäggi currently skips her own team.

Career
Jäggi is a former Swiss junior champion. She first appeared on the international scene at the World Junior Curling Championships in 2006, finishing in fourth place after losing in the semifinals and the bronze medal game. She returned to the World Junior Curling Championships two years after, but failed to make the playoffs, finishing in sixth place.

Jäggi began to compete on the World Curling Tour in 2006, making appearances in various European events. She participated in the Swiss national curling championships in 2010, and finished in third place. During the 2011–12 curling season, she broke through with two World Curling Tour wins, at the Kamloops Crown of Curling and the International Bernese Ladies Cup. However, she was only able to repeat her result from the previous year at the Swiss national championships, finishing third again. Jäggi again participated at the Swiss national championships, but lost to Mirjam Ott in the final.

Personal life
Jäggi is currently a business administration student. Her hobbies include snowboarding and travelling.

Grand Slam record

Former events

References

External links

Team Jäggi website

Swiss female curlers
1987 births
Living people
Universiade medalists in curling
Universiade bronze medalists for Switzerland
Competitors at the 2013 Winter Universiade
Competitors at the 2015 Winter Universiade
World mixed doubles curling champions